Mount Gale is a promontory at the north end of Frecker Ridge in the Anare Mountains of Victoria Land, Antarctica. This topographical feature stands at the south side of the confluence of Ludvig Glacier and Kirkby Glacier. It was named by the Antarctic Names Committee of Australia for Commander d'A.T. Gale, formerly of the Royal Australian Navy, a hydrographic surveyor with the Australian National Antarctic Research Expeditions (Thala Dan) cruise that explored this coast, 1962. The mountain lies situated on the Pennell Coast, a portion of Antarctica lying between Cape Williams and Cape Adare.

References

Mountains of Victoria Land
Pennell Coast